The 1997 Speedway Grand Prix Qualification or GP Challenge was a series of motorcycle speedway meetings used to determine the 8 riders that qualified for the 1997 Speedway Grand Prix to join the other 8 riders that finished in the leading positions from the 1996 Speedway Grand Prix.

The format changed slightly in that four riders would qualify straight from the Intercontinental and Continental finals and four riders would qualify through the GP Challenge.

Simon Wigg won the GP Challenge.

Format
 First Round - 5 riders each from Sweden &  Denmark, 3 riders each from Finland & Norway to Scandinavian Final
 First Round - 32 riders from Continental quarter finals to Continental semi-finals
 First Round - 7 riders from British final to Overseas Final
 First Round - 5 riders from Australian/New Zealand final to Overseas Final
 First Round - 4 riders from United States final to Overseas Final
 Second Round - 8 riders from Scandinavian final to Intercontinental Final
 Second Round - 8 riders from Overseas final to Intercontinental Final
 Second Round - 16 riders from Continental semi-finals to Continental Final
 Third Round - 7 riders from positions 9-15 from the 1995 Grand Prix to GP Challenge
 Third Round - 2 riders from the Continental Final to 1997 Grand Prix and 4 to GP Challenge
 Third Round - 2 riders from the Intercontinental Final to 1997 Grand Prix and 5 to GP Challenge
 Final Round - 4 riders from the GP Challenge to the 1997 Grand Prix

First round

Continental quarter finals

Second round

Overseas Final
 3 riders to Intercontinental final+
+ Controversy over tyres at the final saw only 3 riders progress with an extra 5 places awarded in the Scandinavian final.

Scandinavian Final
13 riders to Intercontinental final

Continental semi finals

Third round
7 riders from positions 9-15 from the 1996 Speedway Grand Prix to GP Challenge

Intercontinental Final
 2 riders direct to Grand Prix, 5 riders to GP Challenge, Jimmy Nilsen won the event.

Continental Final 
2 riders direct to Grand Prix, 4 riders to GP Challenge
28 July 1996  Abensberg

Final Round

GP Challenge
4 riders to 1997 Grand Prix
5 October 1996  Prague

References 

Speedway Grand Prix Qualification
Speedway Grand Prix Qualifications
Qualification